The Food Distribution Program on Indian Reservations (FDPIR) allows Indian Tribal Organizations (ITOs) to operate a food distribution program as an alternative to the Food Stamp Program for those living on or near an Indian reservation. The Food and Nutrition Service (FNS), an agency of the U.S. Department of Agriculture, administers FDPIR at the Federal level, and is locally operated through ITOs or State agencies(SAs). Eligibility for benefits is similar to the food stamp (SNAP) program,  and funds are drawn from food stamp appropriations. Food Distribution Program Nutrition Education (FDPIR) grants are also awarded to participating FDPIR ITOs. These grants are awarded to support nutrition education activities that are culturally relevant, promoting healthy food choices, and promoting physical activity among participants.

100 tribal organizations and 5 State agencies receive funding to administer the FDPIR. This supports approximately 276 tribes in receiving the programs benefits. The approximate number of people served by this program monthly in Federal Fiscal Year 2014 totaled to 85,400 individuals. Tribes do not compete with other entities for funding from the program, nor is there a recurring base fund for tribes. FDPIR is one of 15 nutrition assistance programs administered by USDA's Food and Nutrition Service, which also works with the Special Supplemental Nutrition Program for Women, Infants, and Children (WIC), the National School Lunch and School Breakfast programs, and the Summer Food Service Program.

Foods contained in packages include frozen and/or canned meats and poultry, canned and fresh fruits and vegetables, juices, dry cereals, cornmeal, flour, butter, macaroni, cheese, evaporated and UHT lowfat milk, oats, peanuts and peanut butter, cereals, and oils. According to a 2008 USDA FNS report on the Health Eating Index [HEI] of foods provided in FDPIR, "Individuals consuming FDPIR foods in the quantities provided would achieve a HEI-2005 score of 81 out of 100, considerably better than Americans in general (58 out of 100) and SNAP participants (52 out of 100). "

The majority of the foods provided in this program are either frozen or canned, which require substantial food preparation, cooking experience, and education on designing a balanced diet. This program does not provide fresh produce, including vegetables and fruits. For households dependent on FDPIR, individual recipients may be susceptible to developing additional health consequences due to the absence of fresh produce in their diet.

Eligibility 

American Indians who are classified as being low-income and non-Indians who reside on a reservation, and individuals in households living in approved areas near a reservation or in Oklahoma that contain at least one person who is a member of a federally recognized tribe, are eligible to participate in FDPIR.

Applicants may be required to provide documents including but not limited to: pay check stubs, Social Security, Supplemental Security Income benefits, TANF (Temporary Assistance to Needy Families), General Assistance, VA (Veterans benefits), Pensions or retirement benefits, Unemployment or Workers Compensation benefits, Child Support or Alimony, Dependent Care Expenses, and/or bank account statements.

Households are certified based on income and non-financial standards determined by the Federal government, and must be recertified at least every 12 months.  Elderly and disabled households may be certified for up to 24 months. Income standards vary by household size and are based on 100% of the Federal Poverty Guidelines adjusted by the applicable SNAP standard deduction. Households must be re-certified at least every 12 months, but elderly and disabled households may be certified for up to 24 months. Households may not participate in FDPIR and SNAP in the same month.

Evaluation 

According to the USDA's evaluation of the FDPIR, half of local FDPIR programs serve fewer than 250 households per month. The average administrative costs per household ranged from $614 (small programs) to $287 among large programs. Federal regulations do not require local FDPIR programs to offer extensive nutrition education services to program participants. Of those programs evaluated, over 25% reported no nutrition education budget.

The FDPIRs design places a large responsibility on individual participants to create and prepare a nutritious diet from the foods provided. Participants are responsible for selecting their foods, developing cooking skills, and designing meals that constitute a nutritious diet.

In order for the success of the FDPIR to be accurately measured, additional and extensive research must be conducted.

References

External links
 http://www.fns.usda.gov/fdd/programs/fdpir 
 https://web.archive.org/web/20100227213432/http://www.urban.org/uploadedpdf/412034_tribal_food_assistance.pdf
 http://www.fns.usda.gov/sites/default/files/FDPIR_FoodPackage_Summary_0.pdf 
 http://www.fns.usda.gov/sites/default/files/FDPIREval_Summary_0.pdf 

Supplemental Nutrition Assistance Program
United States federal Indian policy